Apollo Automobil (previously known as Gumpert Sportwagenmanufaktur) is a German sports car manufacturer headquartered in Denkendorf. Roland Gumpert, who founded Gumpert Sportwagenmanufaktur in 2004, once held the position of director of Audi Sport. Under his management, Audi won a total of 25 World Rally Championship rallies and four World Rally Championship titles.

History

In 2001, Roland Gumpert proposed a new generation of sports car, one that would be race-ready yet also street-legal. After Gumpert returned to Germany from China at the end of 2001, his former colleague at Audi and founder of Motoren Technik Mayer, Roland Meyer, asked him to assist in building a prototype sports car. Audi approved Gumpert's involvement in this project on the condition that the new sports car would be a series product and not a prototype.

The company was founded in 2004 under the name "GMG Sportwagenmanufaktur
Altenburg GmbH". The technical guidelines were defined and the first designs of the car were drawn by Marco Vanetta. Upon Vanetta's completion of this process, the first 1:4 scale model of Gumpert's car was produced in 2002.

Gumpert continued with the development of the car now called the Apollo, along with the Technical University of Munich and the Ingolstadt University of Applied Sciences. They assisted him with the construction work, computer simulations, and wind tunnel tests. This research and development helped form the blueprint for the first full-scale model. Finally two prototype cars were constructed. The production of the Apollo started in October 2005. Many variants of the Apollo were introduced throughout its production cycle.

On 27 July 2008 an Apollo Sport was featured on the UK automotive show Top Gear. One of the presenters, Richard Hammond and professional driver the Stig drove the car. With a lap time of 1:17.1, the Apollo Sport became the new leader on the Power Lap Board, 0.2 seconds faster than the former lap leader, the Ascari A10. The Apollo was faster than the Bugatti Veyron and the Pagani Zonda around the Top Gear test track. It was later beaten with a time of 01:16.8 by the Bugatti Veyron Super Sport.

In 2011, the company introduced a concept car in collaboration with Carrozzeria Touring Superleggera, the Gumpert Tornante. The car was not put into production.

In August 2013, the company filed for bankruptcy and went into liquidation after an anonymous backer pulled out of a deal that could have saved the company.

In January 2016, the company was purchased by Hong Kong consortium Ideal Team Venture which is also owner of the De Tomaso marque. The company was renamed Apollo Automobil GmbH after the acquisition by its new owner.

In November 2016, the company announced that former owner and founder Roland Gumpert was no longer associated with the company or its current or future projects and also announced a new model (project name ‘Titan’) would be unveiled at the June 2017 Goodwood Festival of Speed. The new model is named Intensa Emozione (Intense Emotion in Italian) and is powered by the 6.3 L naturally-aspirated V12 engine. The car has radical styling inspired by insects in nature. The Intensa Emozione is built in collaboration with HWA AG, the same company involved in the construction of the Mercedes-Benz CLK-GTR.

Development partners
Apollo collaborated with several business and technical partners, including the following:

 Autotecnica Motori (engine development)
 Apollo Germany Limited (paints and repairs)
 ATS Group (development and production of wheels)
 BFFT (automotive electronics)
 Bosch Group (automobile components and systems, including ABS and TCS)
 BREMBO (brakes)
 Eibach (sports chassis development)
 HS Genion (automotive engineering)
 KBF Kabelbaumfertigung (the Apollo's cabling, measuring 4.2 km)
 KW Automotive (sport suspension systems)
 Mero TSK (Mengeringhausen tube system)
 Pirelli (road and racing tyres)
 TRW (active and passive vehicle safety systems)
 Technical University of Munich (virtual prototyping, vibration technology and driver-vehicle interaction)
 WIDOS (welding plastic tubing and moulded parts)
 Contrust (optimized risk management)
 Evolution MotorSports (US development partner and distribution)
 GTE Engineering (development and production of kevlar clutch facing)
 HWA AG (development and final details for the Intensa Emozione)

Motorsport

During April 2005, the Apollo made its racing debut in the Divinol Cup. This Apollo was driven by the Belgian race driver Ruben Maes. Maes finished third on the Hockenheimring race track. Three years later Gumpert announced that they would enter a hybrid electric version of the Apollo in the 2008 24 Hours Nürburgring, driven by 2004 winner Dirk Müller and former Formula One racer Heinz-Harald Frentzen. Three months passed between the first discussions and the finished hybrid Apollo. The Apollo was driven in the 24 Hours Nürburgring in May 2008. The car has the ability to recharge the battery under braking.

See also
 Gumpert Apollo
 Apollo Arrow
 Apollo Intensa Emozione
 De Tomaso P72

References

External links
 

Car manufacturers of Germany
Defunct motor vehicle manufacturers of Germany
Sports car manufacturers
Companies based in Thuringia
Altenburg
Vehicle manufacturing companies established in 2004
Vehicle manufacturing companies disestablished in 2013
Privately held companies of Germany
German brands
Car brands
German companies established in 2004
German companies disestablished in 2013